Dicranoclista is a genus of bee flies in the family Bombyliidae. There are at least two described species in Dicranoclista.

Species
, four species are recognized:
 Dicranoclista auliae  — Sudan
 Dicranoclista fasciata Johnson & Johnson, 1960 — USA (Ariz., Idaho, Ore., Utah, Wash.)
 Dicranoclista simpsoni  — Gambia, Senegal
 Dicranoclista vandykei (Coquillett, 1894) — USA (Calif., Texas, Wyo.)

References

Further reading

External links

 

Bombyliidae
Bombyliidae genera